The Plunger class was an early class of United States Navy submarines. In the first years of their service, they were used primarily as training and experimental vessels for the newly formed "silent service" to familiarize naval personnel with the performance and operations of such craft. They were known as the "A class" after being renamed to A-type designations (A-1 through A-7) on 17 November 1911. All except Plunger ended up being stationed in the Philippines, an American possession, prior to the outbreak of World War I. They were shipped there on colliers (coal-carrying ships) and formed an integral part of the harbor defense system for Manila. In some instances, this class of submarines is referred to as the Adder class, as USS Adder was the first boat of the class to be completed.

Design and construction 

These boats were essentially an enlarged and improved version of the Holland, with a much more powerful 4-cylinder, 160 bhp Otto engine and an enlarged battery. Their increased size allowed a crewman to stand upright inside the boat. They were designed by Electric Boat under the direct supervision of John Philip Holland and were known to the company as design EB 7. The design was considered such an advance over the Holland that the company took the unusual step of ordering a prototype of the class using internal company funds. The prototype, named Fulton, was built at Lewis Nixon's Crescent Shipyard in New Jersey. It was a fortunate move, as the Fulton's company trials turned up numerous deficiencies that needed to be corrected. These trials, along with the need to correct the noted deficiencies delayed the building of the Plungers quite a bit. On average the boats were delivered to the Navy two years late. Although Fulton eventually did quite well on trials, proving the capabilities of the Plungers, there were no approved appropriations from the Navy to purchase her so she was sold to Russia, and renamed .

A single hull design, all ballast and fuel tanks were located internally. The battery had 66 cells located underneath the torpedo reloads and was 24% more powerful than the one installed on Holland. The battery was open-topped, and when the decking was removed the battery acid could be seen sloshing around inside the cells. The top was shellacked wooden planks, with a layer of rubber above and finally a shellacked canvas covering. Holland's emphasis was on optimizing underwater performance, and thus the boats had very little superstructure topside and a very small conning tower. Since these boats were intended for harbor defense and would be operating in relatively calm waters, this was not initially considered a problem. They were not internally subdivided, there was essentially one large compartment from bow to stern. One man, a very busy Commanding Officer, stood on a raised platform amidships with his head up inside the conning tower so he could see out of the small deadlight windows there. Initially there were no periscopes. Several wheels and control levers were within reach of this station, with the Commanding Officer acting as both a helmsman and a diving plane operator. He kept track of his bearings and any potential target by periodically broaching the boat so he could see out of the deadlights. The designed test depth was 100 feet, although Porpoise survived an accidental grounding at 144 feet in 1904.

Builder's and Navy trials of the class noted several defects that needed to be corrected. Ventilation of the gasoline engine was poor, the main switchboard needed to be relocated, the 30-foot depth gauge was inadequate, the torpedo tube muzzle door was awkward to use, and periscopes were highly desired. Most notably, the lack of superstructure and the short conning tower made these boats prone to flooding when surfaced in even a moderate sea state. A modification program was drawn up and approved by the Navy and starting in January, 1905 the boats were taken in hand for the needed work. Eventually most of the boats were fitted with two fixed height periscopes, with a taller conning tower that had a large fairwater built around it. A removeable bow fairing was put in place to increase seaworthiness, helping to push the bow wake away from the conning tower. Since the boats found themselves spending more time on the surface than originally thought, a surface steering station was added forward of the conning tower fairwater, connected by a shaft to the main steering mechanism below. A small, metal framework and canvas bridge structure could be erected topside for extended surface transits. It had to be disassembled and taken below before diving. The diving process was quite lengthy and complicated, taking several minutes from being fully surfaced to fully submerged. The tactical environment that these boats operated in did not necessitate quick dives, thus the lengthy dive process was not seen as a liability.
   
At this point in their corporate history, Electric Boat was a design and engineering firm only. They did not have their own shipyard and thus sub-contracted out the construction of all their boats. The Plunger class was built at two different locations on both coasts of the United States. Five were built at Crescent Shipyards, while two more were built at Union Iron Works in San Francisco.

Service 
The five East Coast boats were based at Holland Torpedo Boat Station at New Suffolk, New York from 1903 until 1905, allowing New Suffolk to claim to be the first submarine base in the United States.  The squadron moved from New Suffolk to Newport, Rhode Island in 1905 where they were used to test torpedoes and develop submarine tactics.

In 1908 the A-2, A-4, A-6 and A-7 were moved on ships to Subic Bay in the Philippine Islands, where they served through the First World War.  They were joined in 1915 by A-3 and A-5.

After the initial deficiencies were worked out these boats served the Navy quite well for their entire service lives. They were considered pathfinders in submarine technology, and the design drew great interest from foreign navies. A slightly modified design, EB 7P, formed the basis for the first submarines of the British Royal Navy, and the navies of Japan, the Netherlands, and Imperial Russia. However, the rapidly advancing military technology of the early 20th century quickly made these boats obsolescent, and by the end of World War I they were completely outmoded.

The class was given alphanumeric hull classification symbols (SS-2, SS-3, etc.) on 17 July 1920, after all but Grampus (SS-4) and Pike (SS-6) had been decommissioned.  All of the Plunger-class boats were decommissioned by 1921, and all except Plunger used as targets. They were stricken from the Naval Vessel Register on 16 January 1922 and sold for scrap.

Boats in class

See also
 Holland-class submarine (British Royal Navy version)

References

Bibliography

External links

Navsource.org early submarines page
Pigboats.com A-boat page
SS-2 A-1 Plunger page on globalsecurity.org

Submarine classes
 
 Plunger